Rimosodaphnella textilis is an extinct species of sea snail, a marine gastropod mollusk in the family Raphitomidae.

Description
The shell reaches a length of 16 mm, its diameter of 5.5 mm.

(Original description in Latin) The shell is subulately turreted, longitudinally ribbed and transversely exquisitely striated, The whorls are smooth, canaliculate above, crossed by lunulate threads. The siphonal canal is elongate and recurved.

(Original description in Italian) This is an elegant shell, whose surface imitates a very fine reticulation, by weaving the longitudinal ribs with the transverse striae which are very numerous. In larger individuals the first are not very apparent because of the depth of the grooves and the height of the striae that inintersect. The whorls are convex and rounded, and they show above, around the suture, a small canal, marked by arched lines coming from the growth lines of the shell. The base is narrow, elongated and somewhat recurved. <ref>Brocchi G.B. (1814). Conchiologia fossile subapennina con osservazioni geologiche sugli Apennini e sul suolo adiacente. Milano. Vol. 1: i-lxxx, 1-56, 1-240; vol. 2: 241-712, 16 pls.

Distribution
Fossils of this species were found in Pliocene strata in the Alpes-Maritimes, France and Italy; age range: 3.6 to 2.588 Ma

References

 Cossmann (M.), 1896 Essais de Paléoconchologie comparée (2ème livraison), p. 1-179
 Cossmann (M.), 1916 Essais de Paléoconchologie comparé. livraison 10, p. 1-292

External links
  Bellardi L. (1877), I molluschi dei terreni terziarii del Piemonte e della Liguria /
 Bonfitto, A.; Morassi, M. (2013). New Indo-Pacific species of Rimosodaphnella Cossmann, 1916 (Gastropoda: Conoidea): a genus of probable Tethyan origin. Molluscan Research. 33(4): 230-236
 MNHN, Paris: Raphitoma textilis
 MNHN, Paris: Daphnella (Bellardiella) textilis
  

textilis
Gastropods described in 1814